Dysticheus is a genus of broad-nosed weevils in the beetle family Curculionidae. There are at least two described species in Dysticheus.

Species
These two species belong to the genus Dysticheus:
 Dysticheus insignis Horn, 1876 i c g b
 Dysticheus rotundicollis Van Dyke, 1953 i c g
Data sources: i = ITIS, c = Catalogue of Life, g = GBIF, b = Bugguide.net

References

Further reading

 
 
 
 

Entiminae
Articles created by Qbugbot